Raywood is an unincorporated community in Liberty County, Texas, United States.

Education
Raywood is zoned to schools in the Hull-Daisetta and Liberty Independent School District.

References

External links

Unincorporated communities in Liberty County, Texas
Unincorporated communities in Texas